Leunen may refer to:

 De Leunen, football stadium
 Maarty Leunen (born 1985), basketballer

See also
 Christine Leunens (born 1964), novelist